The Gift of Love: A Christmas Story is a 1983 American made-for-television Christmas drama film, originally broadcast on CBS as an annual tradition for more than five years, premiering December 20, 1983. It starred Lee Remick, Angela Lansbury and Polly Holliday. It was produced by Dick Atkins and Michael Lepiner; directed by Academy Award winner Delbert Mann; and written by Earl Hamner, Jr., creator of The Waltons, based on the short story "The Silent Stars Go By" by Bess Streeter Aldrich. The film was filmed on location in 1983 in Vermont, mainly in Burlington and the small town of Chelsea.

Plot
With her world in turmoil, Janet (Lee Remick) feels she is losing so much that is important… her beloved mother (Angela Lansbury), the family business, maybe even her husband. Janet dreams of simpler times, of Christmas in the idyllic Vermont of her younger days, and of taking her children back to the family home where her parents and spinster aunt (Polly Holliday) would be waiting for them. And they are, in all the warmth of the holiday. But only when even more seems lost, as one of her children is in jeopardy, does Janet search for that ‘secret place’ where we all may find what really matters, at Christmas and always.

Reviews
Writing for The Star-Ledger, the film was praised as "The epitome of this year's Christmas offerings. Will catch at your heart and loosen your tear ducts. If you loved 'It's a Wonderful Life' or 'The Homecoming' you will spend a four-handkerchief night with 'The Gift of Love.' The entire project is a joy."

Albany News described the film as "...a tale of love, joy, memory and disappointment, put together in a way that will touch your heart."

In a review for the Los Angeles Times, the film was praised for "Lovely performances by Lee Remick and Angela Lansbury... luminous presence of Polly Holliday... make this a special that merits repeating in seasons to come."

See also
 List of Christmas films

References

External links
 

1983 television films
1983 films
1980s Christmas drama films
American Christmas drama films
Christmas television films
CBS network films
Films based on short fiction
Films directed by Delbert Mann
Films set in Vermont
Films shot in Vermont
1980s English-language films
1980s American films